The Nara Canal is a deepened delta channel of the Indus River in Sindh province, Pakistan. It was built as an excavated channel stemming off the left bank of the Indus River to join the course of the old Nara River, a tributary c.q. paleochannel of the Indus which received water from the Ghaggar-Hakra until the Hakra dried-up, early 2nd millennium BCE.

Geography
The canal runs from above the Sukkur Barrage through the districts of Khairpur, Sanghar, Mirpurkhas and Tharparkar to the Jamrao Canal. The Nara is the longest canal in Pakistan,
About  of land are irrigated by this canal. Within the Khairpur District, the canal and its associated wetlands were made into the Nara Game Reserve in 1972.

Construction of the canal
Before the construction of the Nara canal, the Indus River used to overflow in Bahawalpur and Sind Province above Rohri and the spillovers used to enter the Nara River. Bunds were constructed by the Bahawalpur state authorities to protect their lands against floods and spillovers, which reduced the flood intensities into the Nara River. Similarly, due to low flows in the Indus River in certain years, the Nara River did not get much water. Therefore, the Nara supply channel was excavated in 1858–59 to directly supply water from the Indus river. The supply channel was excavated by 2.5 feet in 1884-85 and by a further 3.5 feet in 1893.

Chotiari Dam is located in the catchment area of the Nara Canal. The Nara Canal drains in to Shakoor Lake before overflowing into Kori Creek of the Great Rann of Kutch. This delta channel or river is known as the Puran River or the Koree River in its lower reaches.

Nara river 
The Nara was a tributary, c.q. paleochannel, of the Indus, and a paleochannel of Ghaggar-Hakra river system. After traversing Bahawalpur, the Hakra used to enter into the present Nara Canal a few miles downstream of its present head. The Ghaggar-Hakra is identified with the Vedic Sarasvati river, although the Hakra had already dried-up by Vedic times.

See also
 Left Bank Outfall Drain
 Allah Bund

Notes

References

Sources
Printed sources

 

 

 

 

 

 

Web-sources

External links 
 Nara Canal marked on OpenStreetMap, retrieved 19 March 2021.
 Eatern Nara, Imperial Gazetteer of India (1908)

Canals in Pakistan
Sarasvati River